Larry A. Mumper is a former Republican member of the Ohio Senate, representing the 26th District from 1997 to 2008.

External links
Project Vote Smart – Senator Larry A. Mumper (OH) profile
Follow the Money – Larry Mumper
2006 2004 2002 2000 1998 campaign contributions

Republican Party Ohio state senators
1937 births
Living people
People from Loudonville, Ohio
21st-century American politicians